Tuggeranong Interchange is located in Tuggeranong Town Centre, Canberra. All services are operated by ACTION. It consists of 7 platforms and provides connections between bus routes servicing the District of Tuggeranong. The bus station is located next to South.Point Tuggeranong on a section of Pitman St between Holwell and Anketell Streets which is closed to regular vehicular traffic.

History
Tuggeranong bus station opened on 9 August 1991. In April 2019 it was renamed Tuggeranong Interchange.

Services
Tuggeranong Interchange is served by ACTION services.

References

External links

Bus stations in Australia
Bus transport in Canberra
Transport buildings and structures in the Australian Capital Territory
Transport infrastructure completed in 1991
1991 establishments in Australia